The Kala forest tree frog, Leptopelis omissus, is a species of frog in the family Arthroleptidae found in Cameroon, the Republic of the Congo, Gabon, and Nigeria, and possibly Angola, the Central African Republic, the Democratic Republic of the Congo, and Equatorial Guinea.
Its natural habitats are subtropical or tropical moist lowland forest, rivers, swamps, freshwater marshes, and heavily degraded former forests.
It is threatened by habitat loss.

References
 

Leptopelis
Taxonomy articles created by Polbot
Amphibians described in 1992
Taxobox binomials not recognized by IUCN